Nathan Otávio Ribeiro (born 2 June 1990), known as Nathan Ribeiro or simply Nathan, is a naturalized Qatari footballer who plays as a central defender. He was born in Toledo, Brazil but became a naturalized Qatari in October 2013, after living in the country for 5 years, for the sake of not counting towards his club's foreign player quota.

References

External links
 
 
 

1990 births
Living people
Brazilian footballers
Al-Rayyan SC players
Fluminense FC players
Kashiwa Reysol players
Fortaleza Esporte Clube players
Coritiba Foot Ball Club players
Qatar Stars League players
Qatari Second Division players
Campeonato Brasileiro Série A players
J1 League players
Expatriate footballers in Qatar
Expatriate footballers in Japan
Brazilian expatriate sportspeople in Qatar
Brazilian expatriate sportspeople in Japan
Association football central defenders
People from Toledo, Paraná
Campeonato Brasileiro Série B players
Sportspeople from Paraná (state)